The National Transport Commission (NTC), previously known as the National Road Transport Commission, is an Australian statutory body created to develop regulatory and operational reform for road, rail and intermodal transport.

Under Australia's federal system, transport policy and regulatory responsibilities span across Commonwealth, state and territory, and local governments. Differences between these regulatory systems mean that national transport operators can face inconsistent regulations, creating unnecessary inefficiency and cost.

The NTC is focused on reforms which improve the productivity, safety and environmental outcomes of the Australian transport system . This has subsequently led to the development of transport regulatory policies such as Performance-Based Standards, Heavy Vehicle Driver Fatigue Reform and the Chain of Responsibility.

The NTC also plays a role in implementation planning to ensure reform outcomes are relevant and effective, as well as coordinating, monitoring, evaluating and maintaining the implementation of approved reforms. Recommendations and advice are presented to the Standing Council on Transport and Infrastructure (SCOTI) - comprising transport, infrastructure and planning ministers - for approval by majority vote.

Based in Melbourne, the NTC has six commissioners including a Chief Executive. Dr Gillian Miles was appointed Chief Executive Officer in 2019.

History

Hughes & Vale case
Australia is a federation that relies on the Constitution to divide power between the Commonwealth (federal) government and the six original States (see federalism in Australia). As the Commonwealth of Australia Constitution Act did not specify Federal control over road transport, it effectively relinquished full jurisdiction of that area to the States.

In 1952, truck drivers were frustrated by the levies on interstate road transport, which were designed to protect the state-owned railways. They placed a copy of the constitution in a barrow and pushed it by hand between Melbourne and Sydney. This journey took 11 days, 2 days quicker than a parcel mailed at the same time and carried by rail.

Their purpose was to challenge the validity of the New South Wales State Transport Act against "Section 92 of the Constitution which provides that trade, commerce and intercourse between the States shall be absolutely free".

Known as the Hughes & Vale case, they eventually led a successful constitutional challenge in the High Court which opened-up the development of interstate road transport and Australia in general.

Hughes & Vale was a significant turning point for the transport industry in Australia. It was the catalyst for the growth of interstate road transport, which in turn highlighted the limitations of having different road transport regulations between states.

Razorback Blockade

In 1979, 3000 truck drivers staged blockages of major highways at nearly 40 locations in Queensland, Victoria, New South Wales and South Australia to protest against ton-mile taxes and low freight rates. Known as the Razorback Blockade (for a blockage of the Hume Highway at the top of Razorback Mountain, near Picton, New South Wales) truck drivers involved claimed higher charges made them financially worse off. Their efforts were not in vain and ton-mile tax was abolished shortly after the protests.

Apart from charging woes, there was also a demand for a list of reforms such as the establishment of advisory bodies to solve problems in the industry, equal pay for all drivers, licensing to control the number of trucks in the industry and uniform weight and speed limits to be implemented.

Establishment of the National Road Transport Commission

Both the Hughes & Vale case and the Razorback blockade were contributing factors to the recommendation in the last report of the Inter-State Commission (ISC) proposing significant changes be made for all vehicle charges, and that a National Commission be created.

At the time, microeconomic reform was a central policy of the Labor Commonwealth government. The cooperation of all six States and two Territories was needed as many of its high priority agendas such as transport, and electricity generation and distribution were State governed.

The assembly of leaders at the Special Premiers Conference in 1991, including the notable support of Premier Nick Greiner of New South Wales, a non-Labor Government, gave bipartisan support to the reform process.

In 1991, the National Road Transport Commission was formally established by an inter-governmental agreement.

2002 review

Under its enabling legislation, the NTC's role and performance must be reviewed every six years by independent steering committee.

The 2002 review of the National Road Transport Commission Act recommended that the NRTC's role be expanded to include rail and intermodal transport to encourage a more holistic approach to land transport reforms.

Rail transport regulations in Australia are also governed by States and Territories and, like road transport, culminated in a number of inconsistencies across the nation. It was noted rail transport system in Australia was ready for a more formal process of reform parallel to that of road transport and that operators and track owners on the national road network needed consistent processes for safety regulation.
High priority issues targeted for rail regulatory reform included the establishment of a framework to improve and strengthen the co-regulatory system including application of mutual recognition, and the development of a national policy on key safety issues such as fatigue, testing for drugs and alcohol and medical fitness of safety-critical rail workers.

In 2004, the National Road Transport Commission was formally renamed the National Transport Commission to accommodate the inclusion of rail and intermodal transport into its existing mandate. Consequently, the existing National Road Transport Commission Act 1991 was replaced by the National Transport Commission Act 2003.

The National Transport Advisory Council (NTAC)
Also included in the 2002 review of the NRTC was a recommendation for the creation of a non-statutory body called the National Transport Advisory Council (NTAC). The proposed function of NTAC was to conduct strategic analyses and give advice to the ATC on strategic priorities for national infrastructure investment, options for pricing of access to road, rail and other transport infrastructure and directions and priorities for modal integration relevant to national freight issues.

The long term intention was for functions of the NTAC to be transferred through to the National Transport Commission after three years if agreed upon unanimously by the ATC. Despite the recommendation, NTAC was never implemented.

2009 review
A steering committee was appointed in January 2009 to conduct the NTC's most recent review and delivered its final report to the Chair of the Australian Transport Council (ATC, the predecessor to SCOTI) in August 2009. The Coalition of Australian Governments (COAG) and the ATC endorsed the recommendations in December 2009.

Key recommendations which were endorsed included:
Explicitly expanding the NTC's mandate to include working with jurisdictions to develop viable implementation plans
Monitoring and evaluating national reform outcomes using a broader range of tools, including data collection, post-implementation research and effectiveness reviews
Focusing on priority projects set by the ATC and regularly reporting on project progress
The NTC Commissioners to be appointed as a governing board under the Commonwealth Authorities and Companies Act 1997.

Effectiveness

The work of the NTC has attracted support and criticism since its establishment.  The commission's early projects led to major gains in many areas of road transport, particularly in the heavy vehicle sector.  Widely praised early reforms delivered included charges, registration, dangerous goods, licensing, vehicle standards and mass and access.  The delivery of the Australian Road Rules in 1999 represented a major reform initiative touching both the light and heavy vehicle sectors.  The commission's recent work in the rail safety area, however, has been the subject of concern among some Governments and other stakeholders.  While support was obtained for NTC's efforts in securing State and Territory approval for a model Rail Safety statute for Australia based on existing regulation, later work in developing operative legislation in the same field has been criticised based on concern about insufficient analysis.

Concerns have also been expressed about inconsistent drug and blood alcohol standards across the country.

Current reform projects
Some of the reform projects currently being undertaken by the NTC include:

National Heavy Vehicle Regulator – In July 2009, COAG agreed to establish an independent National Heavy Vehicle Regulator which will administer a national system of laws for heavy vehicles with a gross vehicle mass of over 4.5 tonnes. Located in Brisbane, Queensland the regulator and laws are to come into effect by 1 January 2013. The NTC is undertaking the legislation work stream for the National Heavy Vehicle Regulator project. This involves consolidating existing legislation, resolving outstanding policy issues to support the establishment of the new regulators and finalising the Heavy Vehicle National Law.
National Rail Safety Regulator - Australia currently has seven rail safety regulators administering an agreed national law with state variations. In 2009, COAG approved the establishment of a single to deliver improved safety outcomes, reduce the regulatory burden on industry and increasing cost-effectiveness for governments. NTC is undertaking the legislation workstream of the project, which is focused on consolidating existing law for inclusion in the new national legislation.
COAG Road Reform Plan - The COAG Road Reform Plan was established by the Coalition of Australian Governments (COAG) to undertake a feasibility study investigating alternative charging systems for heavy vehicles. The NTC is contributing to the feasibility study that may result in changes to Australia's current heavy vehicle charging scheme. A range of alternative charging models are being considered, aimed at better aligning the road prices charged with the actual costs imposed by a vehicle on the roads (based on the mass carried, distance travelled and types of roads used).
National Ports Strategy – Former Prime Minister Kevin Rudd requested that Infrastructure Australia and the NTC develop a National Ports Strategy. The strategy which aims to drive a coordinated approach from all levels of government to planning for ports and their road and rail links, in the face of growing freight demand.
Modular B-triples - B-triples, which comprise a prime mover and three semi-trailers, operate almost Australia-wide. However, their uptake is currently hindered by inconsistent road access and operating conditions across state and territory borders. The Council of Australian Governments (COAG) directed the NTC to develop a national framework for modular B-triple operations to provide wider and more consistent B-triple access across the country.
Performance Based Standards – The NTC developed the Performance Based Standards scheme, in which heavy vehicles do not subscribe to the traditional 'prescriptive' regulations regarding length and mass and are specifically designed to perform a certain task as productively as possible. PBS vehicles need to meet 16 minimum vehicle 'performance' standards to ensure they are stable on the road and can turn and stop safely. The scheme has been in operation within state and territory roads authorities since October 2007. The NTC is currently working on improvements to the scheme which are designed to improve national consistency and certainty of access for industry.

Organisational timeline
1991 – NRTC is formally established with Gordon Amedee as Chairman and Neil Aplin as Chief Executive Officer (CEO).
1993 – New appointment, John Hurlstone, Chairman.
1996 – New appointment, David O’Sullivan, CEO.
1998 – New appointment, Stuart Hicks, Chairman and Jim Stevenson, CEO.
2001 – New appointment, Tony Wilson, CEO.
2004 - National Road Transport Commission is formally renamed National Transport Commission (NTC)
2006 – New appointment, Michael Deegan, Chairman and Nick Dimopoulos, CEO.
2009 – New appointment, Greg Martin, Chairman.

See also

Australian Road Rules
List of Australian Commonwealth Government entities
Transport in Australia

References

Notes and citations

Sources

External links
 

Transport organisations based in Australia
Commonwealth Government agencies of Australia
1992 establishments in Australia
Government agencies established in 1992